Richard Lewis Martell, also known as "Rich Martell" or "Dicky M" (born 10 February 1989), is an Internet entrepreneur best known for founding Floxx Media Group, orderswift, being the creator of FitFinder and business expert on the television series Million Dollar Intern.

Early life
According to sources, Martell started his first internet business, when he was only 15 years old to provide income throughout his education at Bedford School and later University College London.  Whilst at University Martell worked in the Technology divisions of a number of investment firms including Goldman Sachs.

FitFinder
Martell launched FitFinder on Friday, 23 April 2010 at 9am; within 6 hours of the site being up it had to be pulled down due to such high demand and abuse. He said the site was intended "just for a few of us to communicate on throughout the day, however word got out at UCL, and after 2 days of it being online, the UCL one alone had over 25,000 unique users.". He was quoted later describing his surprise at the popularity of it as it was 'only a joke'.

In May 2010, Martell was given the maximum fine by his university for 'bringing the university into disrepute'. Martell refused to remove the site; however, on 28 May 2010, the website was removed and replaced with a holding page and message signed off by Dicky M citing 'increased pressure' from universities to remove the site. He vowed to bring back a new improved FitFinder for the next academic year.

Floxx Media Group
On 3 January 2011, Martell launched his new business, Floxx. The initial concept of Floxx was based around a mobile app which was similar to FitFinder but with a few subtle differences. It was reported that Martell had initially raised funding from Dragons Den investor, Doug Richard and US super angel Kevin Wall.

In July 2011, Martell announced that Floxx was going to focus on developing ideas that were specifically for use on mobile platforms, especially location-based social networks. A few months later, the app MapChat was launched reaching a top 10 ranking in the app store. In October, Martell launched Spottd – a location-based social network allowing users to share and discover posts around them.

In early 2012, Martell announced that Floxx would be expanding and launching a digital media agency business as part of the company, thereby drawing from his team's experience with mobile apps, product design and highly scalable websites.

orderswift
Martell launched orderswift in March 2013 after being frustrated that his favourite restaurants would not take orders online and deliver. Previously called Delishery, orderswift was announced as one of the companies to raise investment from Telefonica and become part of the Wayra accelerator in London.

In an interview with Real Business, Martell said that he believes that restaurants have been slow to adopt technology, and cites the example of them being under capacity outside of peak times: “If you’ve ever been to Pizza Express on a Tuesday or a Sunday night you will realise that they are not even close to capacity.”

One of the key features of the orderswift experience is to give customers the ability to track their order in real time. Martell says “We are going to be allowing customers to stay up to date and know exactly when their food is cooked.”

Million Dollar Intern
In 2013, Martell was filmed as part of the BBC Worldwide television series, Million Dollar Intern.

Personal life
In 2011, he was named as one of Business Zone's 'One to Watch'. Late in 2011 Martell was also shortlisted for the Real Business Young Entrepreneur of the Year.

References

External links
The Times School Gate
The Zuckerberg Story this is not, Tech Crunch
The Guardian Mortarboard
Floxx.com
RichMartell.com

1989 births
Living people
People from Bedford
English businesspeople
People educated at Bedford School
Alumni of University College London